Toxonotus fascicularis is a species of fungus weevil in the beetle family Anthribidae. It is found in the Caribbean Sea and North America.

References

Further reading

 
 

Anthribidae
Articles created by Qbugbot
Beetles described in 1833